State Highway 142 (SH 142) is a short Texas state highway that runs from San Marcos to Lockhart.

History
The route was designated on December 16, 1929 along its current route. Prior to May 28, 2009, the route was located entirely within Caldwell County. In that year, the SH 142 designation was extended into Hays County, concurrent with  SH 80, to a junction with Interstate 35.

Major intersections

References

142
Transportation in Hays County, Texas
Transportation in Caldwell County, Texas